Kevin Blake (born 30 November 1960) is a New Zealand former weightlifter. He competed at the 1984 Summer Olympics and the 1988 Summer Olympics.

References

External links
 

1960 births
Living people
New Zealand male weightlifters
Olympic weightlifters of New Zealand
Weightlifters at the 1984 Summer Olympics
Weightlifters at the 1988 Summer Olympics
Sportspeople from Auckland
20th-century New Zealand people
21st-century New Zealand people